Oststraße is a major underground station on the Düsseldorf Stadtbahn lines U70, U74, U75, U76, U77, U78 and U79 in Düsseldorf. The station lies on Oststraße in the district of Stadtmitte.

The station was opened in 1988 and consists of two island platform with four rail tracks on three levels. On the surface, Charlottenstraße/Oststraße station is located within walking distance and offers connections to Tram line 707.

External links 

 

Düsseldorf VRR stations
Railway stations in Germany opened in 1988